Usapang Real Love (stylized as URL: Usapang Real Love / ) is a 2016 Philippine television drama romantic comedy anthology broadcast by GMA Network. It premiered on September 25, 2016 replacing Conan, My Beautician. The show concluded on December 18, 2016 with a total of 14 episodes.

The series is streaming online on YouTube.

Chapters

"Dream Date"
 Air-date: September 25, 2016 - October 16, 2016
 Director: Real Florido
 Cast and characters:
 Miguel Tanfelix as Diego Cablao
 Bianca Umali as Grace Anne Manalo
 Jak Roberto as Juan Miguel Samaniego
 Ces Quesada as Mercidita Delgado
 Jade Lopez as Lily Anne Manalo
 Yayo Aguila as Gina Cablao
 Lloyd Samartino as Fabian Samaniego
 Gene Padilla as Mario Cablao
 Caprice Cayetano as Diana Daenarys Cablao
 Jonathan Sebastian Trinidad as chef Biboy

"Perfect Fit"
 Air-date: October 23, 2016 - November 20, 2016
 Director: Jorron Lee Monroy
 Cast and characters:
 Andre Paras as Eugene
 Mikee Quintos as Cindy and Ella
 Jay Arcilla as Kristoff
 Arra San Agustin as Meg 
 Mickey Ferriols as Amanda Lace
 William Lorenzo as Fred
 Bekimon as Chicklet
 Vince Gamad as Jose
 Dayara Shane as Athena
 Bryce Eusebio as young Eugene

"Relationship Goals"
 Air-date: November 27, 2016 - December 18, 2016
 Director: Lemuel Lorca
 Cast and characters:
 Aljur Abrenica as Kiso
 Janine Gutierrez as Yapi
 Stephanie Sol as Angel
 Sherilyn Reyes as Queen
 Dennis Padilla as Ricky
 Maricel Morales as Veronique
 Mikoy Morales as Alon
 Lovely Abella as Aimee
 Kyle Vergara as Roni
 Allysa De Real as Buttercup
 Jenny Catchong as Bubbles
 Bryan Benedict as Will
 Kai Atienza as Ali
 Sarah Pagcaliwagan as Diane

Ratings
According to AGB Nielsen Philippines' Urban Luzon household television ratings, the pilot episode of Usapang Real Love earned a 12.8% rating. While the final episode scored a 10.2% rating in Nationwide Urban Television Audience Measurement People in television homes.

References

External links
 

2016 Philippine television series debuts
2016 Philippine television series endings
Filipino-language television shows
GMA Network original programming
Philippine anthology television series
Television shows set in the Philippines